Cathedral of Saint Michael the Archangel is a Ukrainian Orthodox church located at the left bank of the river Kalmius, Mariupol, Ukraine.

General Information 
The cathedral is a six-domed church, built between 1996 and 1998 and designed by the architects V. N. Konstantinow, L. N. Kuzminkow (Russian: В. Н. Константинов, Л. Н. Кузьминков).

The cathedral is a church, built of red brick over the course of two years and completed and consecrated in 1997. It can accommodate from 200 to 1,000 parishioners. 

From the observation deck of the cathedral one has panoramic views of the Sea of Azov, coastal villages of the Left Bank, green villages and hills, in particular a hill called Slag Mountain, which arose as a result of the work of the Azovstal Iron and Steel Works. 

The church is commonly known as "Pozhivanovska" in honor of the former mayor of Mariupol, Mikhail Pozhivanov, who was the initiator and patron of the project of constructing this church.

The church is home to icons and shrines, the main shrine being the copy of the icon of the Mother of God "Life-Giving Spring", created at the beginning of the 19th century. Other icons are of the Archangel Michael of God and St. Nicholas. There also are icons of saints, in which particles of their remains are embedded: St. Ignatius of Mariupol; St. Lazar the Four Days, Bishop of Kita; Hieromartyr Thaddeus, Archbishop of Tver; Saint Blessed Paul of Taganrog; Martyr Grand Duchess Elizabeth; Rev. Alexy, a man of God; Great Martyr John Sochavsky, and others.  

During World War II, when temples were destroyed, the icons were kept by parishioners. After a period of persecution and unrest, the image of the Mother of God was restored and returned to the church. 

An administrative building was also built on the grounds of the temple to house a Sunday school, a room for the baptism of children and a refectory for the needy.

According to history, Metropolitan Ignatius of Gotfei and Kafai led the migration of Orthodox Greeks from the Crimea to the Azov Sea. 

In 2022, during the Siege of Mariupol, the cathedral was heavily damaged.

Gallery

See Also 
 List of cathedrals in Ukraine

References 

Cathedrals in Ukraine
Culture in Mariupol
Buildings and structures in Mariupol
Ukrainian Orthodox Church (Moscow Patriarchate) cathedrals
Buildings and structures destroyed during the 2022 Russian invasion of Ukraine

External Links 
 YouTube - Cathedral of the Archangel Michael in Mariupol 
 YouTube - Baptism of the Lord: Worship in Mariupol from the Cathedral of the Archangel Michael 
 Images of the cathedral and surrounds
 Images of the Cathedral of the Archangel Michael in Mariupol 
 In pictures: The Ukrainian religious sites ruined by fighting